Wave power is the capture of energy of wind waves to do useful work – for example, electricity generation, water desalination, or pumping water. A machine that exploits wave power is a wave energy converter (WEC).

Waves are generated by wind passing over the sea's surface. As long as the waves propagate slower than the wind speed just above, energy is transferred from the wind to the waves. Air pressure differences between the windward and leeward sides of a wave crest and surface friction from the wind cause shear stress and wave growth.

Wave power is distinct from tidal power, which captures the energy of the current caused by the gravitational pull of the Sun and Moon. Other forces can create currents, including breaking waves, wind, the Coriolis effect, cabbeling, and temperature and salinity differences.

As of 2022, wave power is not widely employed for commercial applications, after a long series of trial projects. Attempts to use this energy began in 1890 or earlier, mainly due to its high power density. 

In 2000 the world's first commercial wave power device, the Islay LIMPET was installed on the coast of Islay in Scotland and connected to the UK national grid. In 2008, the first experimental multi-generator wave farm was opened in Portugal at the Aguçadoura wave park. Both projects have since ended.

Wave energy converters can be classified based on their working principle as either:

 oscillating water columns (with air turbine)
 oscillating bodies (with hydroelectric motor, hydraulic turbine, linear electrical generator)
 overtopping devices (with low-head hydraulic turbine)

History 

The first known patent to extract energy from ocean waves was in 1799, filed in Paris by Pierre-Simon Girard and his son. An early device was constructed around 1910 by Bochaux-Praceique to power his house in Royan, France. It appears that this was the first oscillating water-column type of wave-energy device. From 1855 to 1973 there were 340 patents filed in the UK alone.

Modern pursuit of wave energy was pioneered by Yoshio Masuda's 1940s experiments. He tested various concepts, constructing hundreds of units used to power navigation lights. Among these was the concept of extracting power from the angular motion at the joints of an articulated raft, which Masuda proposed in the 1950s.

The oil crisis in 1973 renewed interest in wave energy. Researchers re-examined waves' potential to extract energy, notably Stephen Salter, Johannes Falnes, Michael E. McCormick, David Evans, Michael French, Nick Newman, and C. C. Mei.

Salter's 1974 invention became known as Salter's duck or nodding duck, officially the Edinburgh Duck. In small scale tests, the Duck's curved cam-like body can stop 90% of wave motion and can convert 90% of that to electricity, giving 81% efficiency.

In the 1980s, as oil prices ebbed, wave-energy funding shrank, although, first-generation prototypes were tested. Climate change later reenergized the field.

The world's first wave energy test facility was established in Orkney, Scotland in 2003 to kick-start the development of a wave and tidal energy industry. The European Marine Energy Centre(EMEC) supported the deployment of more wave and tidal energy devices than any other single site. EMEC provides a variety of test sites in real sea conditions. Its grid-connected wave test site is situated at Billia Croo, on the western edge of the Orkney mainland, and is subject to the full force of the Atlantic Ocean, recording seas as high as 19 metres. Developers testing at the centre include Aquamarine Power, Pelamis Wave Power, and ScottishPower Renewables.

The £10 million Saltire prize challenge was to be awarded to the first to be able to generate 100 GWh from wave power over a continuous two-year period by 2017 (about 5.7 MW average).

According to the president of trade association Ocean Renewable Energy Coalition, “The total potential off the coast of the United States is 252 million megawatt hours a year.” Under the Marine Renewable Energy Research and Development Act of 2007 the United States committed $200 million in federal funds toward wave energy technology to be allocated from 2008 through 2012. The United States Department of Energy (DOE) is responsible for the allocation of $50 million per year for research, development, demonstration and commercial application of ocean energy.   In 2008 fourteen groups received funding. The most notable include Oregon State University and the University of Hawaii. OSU in partnership with the University of Washington, agreed to create the Northwest National Marine Renewable Energy Center for wave and tidal energy. The University of Hawaii agreed to develop and implement a National Renewable Marine Energy Center in Hawaii.

A 2017 study by Strathclyde University and Imperial College focused on the failure to develop "market ready" wave energy devices – despite a UK government investment of over £200 million over 15 years.

Wave Swell Energy installed an oscillating water column trial unit in the Bass Strait at Grassy, King Island (2019). It completed one year of testing in 2022. It is a one-way design that does not require a reversible blade, reducing costs.Its moving parts sit above the waterline. It can be integrated into breakwaters and seawalls. Efficiency averaged 45–50%. The system is positioned as offering "firm power" that is not dependent on intermittent solar and wind sources.

Irish company OceanEnergy's OE35 project is the world's largest floating wave energy device. The company's test machine measures 125 x 59 ft (38.1 x 18 m), drafting 31 ft (9.4 m) weighing 826 tons. The machine is moored to the bottom and captures energy from the fising and falling water levels. The Wells turbine, invented in Belfast in the late 70s uses symmetrically-designed fan blades that convert air coming in either direction into the same direction of rotation. The turbine turns continuously in one direction as the air cycles in and out. OceanEnergy  collaborates with 14 partners. Co-funded by the EU Horizon Europe Programme and Innovate UK, the €19.6-million (US$19.3-million) WEDUSEA project is scheduled in three phases over four years.

 Design and build an OE35 rig tailored to the conditions at the European Marine Energy Test Site. 
 Install and test the machine over two years. 
 Disseminate the results and commercialize the technology at scale.

Physical concepts 

Like most fluid motion, the interaction between ocean waves and energy converters is a high-order nonlinear phenomenon. It is described using the incompressible Navier-Stokes equations
where  is the fluid velocity,  is the pressure,  the density,  the viscosity, and  the net external force on each fluid particle (typically gravity). Under typical conditions, however, the movement of waves is described by Airy wave theory, which posits that

 fluid motion is roughly irrotational,
 pressure is approximately constant at the water surface, and
 the seabed depth is approximately constant.

The most controversial of these assumptions is the second; surface tension effects are negligible only for wavelengths above a few decimetres.

Airy equations 
The first condition implies that the motion can be described by a velocity potential :which must satisfy the Laplace equation,In an ideal flow, the viscosity is negligible and the only external force acting on the fluid is the earth gravity . In those circumstances, the Navier-Stokes equations reduces to which integrates (spatially) to the Bernoulli conservation law:

Linear potential flow theory 

Specifically,The surface elevation  can then be simply derived as a plane wave progressing along the x-axis direction.

Consequences 
Oscillatory motion is highest at the surface and diminishes exponentially with depth. However, for standing waves (clapotis) near a reflecting coast, wave energy is also present as pressure oscillations at great depth, producing microseisms. Pressure fluctuations at greater depth are too small to be interesting for wave power.

The behavior of Airy waves offers two interesting regimes: water deeper than half the wavelength, as is common in the sea and ocean, and shallow water, with wavelengths larger than about twenty times the water depth. Deep waves are dispersionful: Waves of long wavelengths propagate faster and tend to outpace those with shorter wavelengths. Deep-water group velocity is half the phase velocity. Shallow water waves are dispersionless: group velocity is equal to phase velocity, and wavetrains propagate undisturbed.

The following table summarizes the behavior of waves in the various regimes:

Wave power formula 

In deep water where the water depth is larger than half the wavelength, the wave energy flux is

with P the wave energy flux per unit of wave-crest length, Hm0 the significant wave height, Te the wave energy period, ρ the water density and g the acceleration by gravity. The above formula states that wave power is proportional to the wave energy period and to the square of the wave height. When the significant wave height is given in metres, and the wave period in seconds, the result is the wave power in kilowatts (kW) per metre of wavefront length.

For example, consider moderate ocean swells, in deep water, a few km off a coastline, with a wave height of 3 m and a wave energy period of 8 s. Solving for power produces

or 36 kilowatts of power potential per meter of wave crest.

In major storms, the largest offshore waves are about 15 meters high and have a period of about 15 seconds. According to the above formula, such waves carry about 1.7 MW of power across each meter of wavefront.

An effective wave power device captures a significant portion of the wave energy flux. As a result, wave heights diminish in the region behind the device.

Energy and energy flux 

In a sea state, the mean energy density per unit area of gravity waves on the water surface is proportional to the wave height squared, according to linear wave theory:

 

where E is the mean wave energy density per unit horizontal area (J/m2), the sum of kinetic and potential energy density per unit horizontal area. The potential energy density is equal to the kinetic energy, both contributing half to the wave energy density E, as can be expected from the equipartition theorem.

The waves propagate on the surface, and the energy is transported horizontally with the group velocity. The mean transport rate of the wave energy through a vertical plane of unit width, parallel to a wave crest, is the energy flux (or wave power, not to be confused with the output produced by a device), and is equal to:

 with cg the group velocity (m/s).

Due to the dispersion relation for waves under gravity, the group velocity depends on the wavelength λ, or equivalently, on the wave period T.

Wave height is determined by wind speed, the length of time the wind has been blowing, fetch (the distance over which the wind excites the waves) and by the bathymetry (which can focus or disperse the energy of the waves). A given wind speed has a matching practical limit over which time or distance do not increase wave size. At this limit the waves are said to be "fully developed". In general, larger waves are more powerful but wave power is also determined by wave speed, wavelength, and water density.

Wave energy converters 

Wave energy converters (WECs) are generally categorized by the method, by location and by the power take-off system. Locations are shoreline, nearshore and offshore. Types of power take-off include: hydraulic ram, elastomeric hose pump, pump-to-shore, hydroelectric turbine, air turbine, and linear electrical generator. The four most common approaches are:

 point absorber buoys
 surface attenuators
 oscillating water columns
 overtopping devices

Point absorber buoy 

This device floats on the surface, held in place by cables connected to the seabed. The point-absorber has a device width much smaller than the incoming wavelength λ. Energy is absorbed by radiating a wave with destructive interference to the incoming waves. Buoys use the swells' rise and fall to generate electricity directly via linear generators, generators driven by mechanical linear-to-rotary converters, or hydraulic pumps. Energy extracted from waves may affect the shoreline, implying that sites should remain well offshore.

Surface attenuator 

These devices use multiple floating segments connected to one another. They are oriented perpendicular to incoming waves. A flexing motion is created by swells, and that motion drives hydraulic pumps to generate electricity.

Oscillating wave surge converter 

These devices typically have one end fixed to a structure or the seabed while the other end is free to move. Energy is collected from the relative motion of the body compared to the fixed point. Converters often come in the form of floats, flaps, or membranes. Some designs incorporate parabolic reflectors to focus energy at the point of capture. These systems capture energy from the rise and fall of waves.

Oscillating water column 

Oscillating water column devices can be located onshore or offshore. Swells compress air in an internal chamber, forcing air through a turbine to create electricity. Significant noise is produced as air flows through the turbines, potentially affecting nearby birds and marine organisms. Marine life could possibly become trapped or entangled within the air chamber. It draws energy from the entire water column.

Overtopping device 

Overtopping devices are long structures that use wave velocity to fill a reservoir to a greater water level than the surrounding ocean. The potential energy in the reservoir height is captured with low-head turbines. Devices can be on- or offshore.

Submerged pressure differential 
Submerged pressure differential based converters use flexible (typically reinforced rubber) membranes to extract wave energy. These converters use the difference in pressure at different locations below a wave to produce a pressure difference within a closed power take-off hydraulic system. This pressure difference is usually used to produce flow, which drives a turbine and electrical generator. Submerged pressure differential converters typically use flexible membranes as the working surface between the water and the power take-off. Membranes are pliant and low mass, which can strengthen coupling with the wave's energy. Their pliancy allows large changes in the geometry of the working surface, which can be used to tune the converter for specific wave conditions and to protect it from excessive loads in extreme conditions.

A submerged converter may be positioned either on the seafloor or in midwater. In both cases, the converter is protected from water impact loads which can occur at the free surface. Wave loads also diminish in non-linear proportion to the distance below the free surface. This means that by optimizing depth, protection from extreme loads and access to wave energy can be balanced.

Floating in-air converters 

Floating in-air converters potentially offer increased reliability because the device is located above the water, which also eases inspection and maintenance. Examples of different concepts of floating in-air converters include:

 roll damping energy extraction systems with turbines in compartments containing sloshing water
 horizontal axis pendulum systems
 vertical axis pendulum systems

Environmental effects 

Common environmental concerns associated with marine energy include:

 The effects of electromagnetic fields and underwater noise;
 Physical presence's potential to alter the behavior of marine mammals, fish, and seabirds with attraction, avoidance, entanglement
 Potential effect on marine processes such as sediment transport and water quality.
 Foundation/mooring systems can affect benthic organisms via entanglement/entrapment
 Electromotive force effects produced from subsea power cables.
 Minor collision risk 
 Artificial reef accumulation near fixed installations 
 Potential disuption to roosting sites

Potential 

Wave energy's worldwide potential has been estimated to be greater than 2 TW. Locations with the most potential for wave power include the western seaboard of Europe, the northern coast of the UK, and the Pacific coastlines of North and South America, Southern Africa, Australia, and New Zealand. The north and south temperate zones have the best sites for capturing wave power. The prevailing westerlies in these zones blow strongest in winter.

The National Renewable Energy Laboratory (NREL) estimated the wave energy potential for various countries. It estimated that the US' potential was equivalent to 1170 TWh per year or almost 5% of the country's energy consumption. The Alaska coastline accounted for ~50% of the total.

NREL reported that WECs can reach efficiencies near 50%. One study analyzed small devices, reminiscent of buoys, finding them capable of generating upwards of 6 MW of power for a roughly cylindrical 21 kg buoy. Later research points to even smaller versions of WECs that could produce the same amount of energy using roughly one-half of the area as current devices.

Challenges 

Environmental impacts must be addressed. Socio-economic challenges include the displacement of commercial and recreational fishermen, and may present navigation hazards. Supporting infrastructure, such as grid connections, must be provided. Commercial WECs have not always been successful. In 2019, for example, Seabased Industries AB in Sweden was liquidated due to "extensive challenges in recent years, both practical and financial".

Wave farms 
A wave farm (wave power farm or wave energy park) is a group of colocated wave energy devices. The devices interact hydrodynamically and electrically, according to the number of machines, spacing and layout, wave climate, coastal and benthic geometry, and control strategies. The design process is a multi-optimization problem seeking high power production, low costs and limited power fluctuations.

Gallery of wave energy installations

Patents 
WIPO patent application WO2016032360 — 2016 Pumped-storage system – "Pressure buffering hydro power" patent application
 — 2011 Ocean wave energy harnessing device – Pelamis/Salter's Duck Hybrid patent
 — 1974 Apparatus and method of extracting wave energy – The original "Salter's Duck" patent
 — 1977 Apparatus for use in the extraction of energy from waves on water – Salter's method for improving "duck" efficiency
 — 1999 Piezoelectric rotary electrical energy generator
 — 1932 Wave Motor - Parsons Ocean Power Plant - Herring Cove Nova Scotia - March 1925. The world's first commercial plant to convert ocean wave energy into electrical power. Designer - Osborne Havelock Parsons - born in 1873 Petitcodiac, New Brunswick. 
Wave energy converters utilizing pressure differences US 20040217597 A1 — 2004 Wave energy converters utilizing pressure differences

A UK-based company has developed a Waveline Magnet that can achieve a levelized cost of electricity of £0.01/kWh with minimal levels of maintenance.

See also
 List of wave power stations
 List of wave power projects
 Wave power in Australia
 Wave power in New Zealand
 Wave power in Scotland
 Wave power in the United States
 Marine energy
 Ocean thermal energy conversion
 Office of Energy Efficiency and Renewable Energy (OEERE)
 World energy consumption

Notes

References

Further reading
, 431 pp.
, 288 pp.
, 256 pp.
, 601 pp.

External links

"Wave Power: The Coming Wave" from the Economist, June 5, 2008
Tethys – the Tethys database from the Pacific Northwest National Laboratory

 
Bright green environmentalism
Energy conversion
Power station technology
Sustainable technologies